The Great Southern Automobile Company was the first automobile manufacturer in the central South. It was incorporated in Birmingham, Alabama, in 1909 and manufactured automobiles, automobile parts, and buses from its plant in Ensley, where it also maintained a repair department. Its founding officers were Eugene F. Enslen, president; Ike Adler, vice-president; John Kyser, secretary and treasurer; and Eugene F. Enslen, Jr., general manager.

In early 1910, it announced a Model "50" touring car with a wheel base of 124 inches, a 5.25x6 inches bore and stroke engine, capable of 60 bhp.

In 1912, it opened salesrooms in the Empire Building, then the tallest building in Birmingham. The manager was W. O. Fields.

In 1913, it was manufacturing two models:
Great Southern 30, available in two-seater roadster and five-seater touring bodies for $1400.
Great Southern 51, available in a six-seater touring body for $2100.

In 1914, it dropped the Great Southern 30, and concentrated on the manufacture of just the Great Southern 50 chassis, formerly titled the Great Southern 51. The new 50 model was a seven passenger touring body.

By 1915, it was manufacturing a chassis and body for a "one-man, pay-enter" motor bus that was 22 feet long, 8 feet 9 inches high, 7 feet 6 inches wide, rated at 2.25 tons capacity, and could carry 25 passengers.

The company went bankrupt in 1917. Alabama's other pre-1950 car manufactures include Preston Motor's Premocar in Birmingham and Keller in Huntsville.

References

Further reading

Defunct motor vehicle manufacturers of the United States
Companies based in Birmingham, Alabama
Vehicle manufacturing companies established in 1909
Vehicle manufacturing companies disestablished in 1917
1909 establishments in Alabama
1917 disestablishments in Alabama